1,3-Benzodioxolyl-N-methylbutanamine (N-methyl-1,3-benzodioxolylbutanamine, MBDB, 3,4-methylenedioxy-N-methyl-α-ethylphenylethylamine) is an entactogen of the phenethylamine chemical class. It is known by the street names Eden and Methyl-J.  MBDB is a ring substituted amphetamine and an analogue of MDMA. Like MDMA, it has a methylene dioxy substitution at the 3 and 4 position on the aromatic ring; this is perhaps the most distinctive feature that structurally define analogues of MDMA, in addition to their unique effects, and as a class they are often referred to as "entactogens" to differentiate between typical psychostimulant amphetamines that (as a general rule) are not ring substituted. MBDB differs from MDMA by having an ethyl group instead of a methyl group attached to the alpha carbon; all other parts are identical. Modification at the alpha carbon is uncommon for substituted amphetamines. It has IC50 values of 784 nM against 5-HT, 7825 nM against dopamine, and 1233 nM against norepinephrine. Its metabolism has been described in scientific literature.

MBDB was first synthesized by pharmacologist and medicinal chemist David E. Nichols and later tested by Alexander Shulgin and described in his book, PiHKAL: A Chemical Love Story. MBDB's dosage, according to PiHKAL, is 180–210 mg; the proper dosage relative to body mass seems unknown. Its duration is 4–6 hours, with noticeable after-effects lasting for 1–3 hours.

MBDB was initially developed as a non-psychedelic entactogen. It has lower effects on the dopamine system in comparison to other entactogens such as MDMA. MBDB causes many mild, MDMA-like effects, in particular the lowering of social barriers and inhibitions, pronounced sense of empathy and compassion, mood lift, and mild euphoria, all of which are present. MBDB tends to produce less euphoria, psychedelia, and stimulation in comparison to MDMA.

Legal Status
Unlike MDMA, MBDB is not internationally scheduled under the United Nations Convention on Psychotropic Substances. The thirty-second meeting of the WHO Expert Committee on Drug Dependence (September 2000) evaluated MBDB and recommended against scheduling. From the WHO Expert Committee assessment of MBDB: 
Although MBDB is both structurally and pharmacologically similar to MDMA, the limited available data indicate that its stimulant and euphoriant effects are less pronounced than those of MDMA. There have been no reports of adverse or toxic effects of MBDB in humans. Law enforcement data on illicit trafficking of MBDB in Europe suggest that its availability and abuse may now be declining after reaching a peak during the latter half of the 1990s. For these reasons, the Committee did not consider the abuse liability of MBDB would constitute a significant risk to public health, thereby warranting its placement under international control. Scheduling of MBDB was therefore not recommended.

Australia
MBDB is considered a Schedule 9 Prohibited substance in Australia under the Poisons Standard (October 2015). A Schedule 9 substance is a substance which may be abused or misused, the manufacture, possession, sale or use of which should be prohibited by law except when required for medical or scientific research, or for analytical, teaching or training purposes with approval of Commonwealth and/or State or Territory Health Authorities.

Russia
MBDB is included into  Schedule 1 of the Controlled Substances Act.

Sweden
Sveriges riksdags health ministry Statens folkhälsoinstitut classified MBDB as "health hazard" under the act Lagen om förbud mot vissa hälsofarliga varor (translated Act on the Prohibition of Certain Goods Dangerous to Health) as of Feb 25, 1999,  in their regulation SFS 1999:58 listed as "2-metylamino-1-(3,4-metylendioxifenyl)-butan (MBDB)", making it illegal to sell or possess.

See also 
 Ethylbenzodioxolylbutanamine (EBDB; Ethyl-J)
 Methylbenzodioxolylpentanamine (MBDP; Methyl-K)
 UWA-101

References

External links 
 PiHKAL entry
 METHYL-J (MBDB) entry in PiHKAL • info
 Erowid MBDB vault

Substituted amphetamines
Entactogens and empathogens
Benzodioxoles
Designer drugs
Serotonin-norepinephrine-dopamine releasing agents